Halgania cyanea, commonly known as rough halgania, is a species of flowering plant in the family Boraginaceae. It is a small perennial shrub with dull green leaves, bright blue flowers and is endemic to Australia.

Description
It mostly flowers in summer or sporadically throughout the year. The fruit is a brown drupe containing one or two seed.

Taxonomy and naming
Halgania cyanea was first formally described in 1840 by John Lindley and the description was published in A Sketch of the Vegetation of the Swan River Colony. The specific epithet (cyanea) means "dark blue".

Distribution and habitat
Rough halgania occurs in a wide range of situations including sandy loam, sand plains, mallee and sand dunes in Western Australia, South Australia, Victoria and the Northern Territory, but is restricted to mallee communities in New South Wales.

References

Ehretioideae
Flora of New South Wales
Flora of the Northern Territory
Flora of South Australia
Flora of Victoria (Australia)
Flora of Western Australia